Hodgson House may refer to:

in the United States
(sorted by state, then city/town)
Richard and Geraldine Hodgson House, New Canaan, Connecticut, listed on the National Register of Historic Places (NRHP) in Fairfield County
W. B. Hodgson Hall, Savannah, Georgia, listed on the NRHP in Chatham County
Asbury and Sallie Hodgson House, Dillard, Georgia, listed on the NRHP in Rabun County
William Hodgson Two-Family House, Southbridge, Massachusetts, listed on the NRHP in Worcester County, Massachusetts
Hodgson House (Kalispell, Montana), listed on the NRHP in Flathead County
E. F. Hodgson Company Early US manufacturer of "kit" Pre-fab houses

See also
Hodgson-Aid Mill, Sycamore, Missouri, listed on the NRHP in Ozark County, Missouri